Potato tree is a common name which may refer to several large species of nightshade (genus Solanum), especially:
 Solanum crinitum (syn. Solanum macranthum), the giant star potato tree
 Solanum crispum, the Chilean potato tree
 Solanum erianthum, the potato tree
 Solanum wrightii, the Brazilian potato tree